Mark W. Stiles (born November 3, 1948) is an American politician. He served as a Democratic member for the 21st district in the Texas House of Representatives from 1983 to 1999. The Mark Stiles Unit is named after him.

References

1948 births
Living people
Democratic Party members of the Texas House of Representatives